Michael M. Moore (died December 5, 1903) was an American politician from Maryland. He served as a member of the Maryland House of Delegates, representing Cecil County, in 1888.

Career
Michael M. Moore was a Democrat. He served as a member of the Maryland House of Delegates, representing Cecil County, in 1888.

He worked as a watchman at the State Capitol in Annapolis.

Personal life
Moore married Martha Kurtz. They had eight children. Their son Leo M. also served in the Maryland House of Delegates.

Moore died on December 5, 1903, at the age of 57 or 58, at his home in Havre de Grace, Maryland.

References

Year of birth unknown
1840s births
1903 deaths
People from Cecil County, Maryland
People from Havre de Grace, Maryland
Democratic Party members of the Maryland House of Delegates